Dagmar Flores Henríquez —better known as La Vampi (The Vampire Girl) and sometimes spelled as La Vampy or La Vampi de Lajas (The Vampire Girl from Lajas)— is an internet personality and meme known for her YouTube videos, antics, dancing, parodies and porn. Flores' videos have appeared in media such as Comedy Central and BuzzFeed, and has been covered by news sources such as El Vocero, Metro, Primera Hora, and Telemundo.

Notes

References

Internet memes
American Internet celebrities
People from Lajas, Puerto Rico